Quiva is a South American genus of bush cricket in the subfamily Phaneropterinae.

Species
The Orthoptera Species File lists:
 Quiva angieae Cadena-Castañeda, 2013
 Quiva abacata (Brunner von Wattenwyl, 1878)
 Quiva buhrnheimi Cadena-Castañeda, Mendes & Sovano, 2015
 Quiva diaphana Hebard, 1927
 Quiva gutjahrae Cadena-Castañeda, Mendes & Sovano, 2015
 Quiva pulchella Rehn, 1950
 Quiva sharovi Gorochov, 2013

References

Tettigoniidae genera
Phaneropterinae